"Swing High, Swing Low" is a popular song written by Ralph Freed and Burton Lane. It was recorded by the Ink Spots in 1937.

Songs with lyrics by Ralph Freed
Songs with music by Burton Lane
1937 songs
The Ink Spots songs